Mark Mancari (born July 11, 1985) is a Canadian former professional ice hockey right winger. Mancari was drafted by the Buffalo Sabres in the seventh round (207th overall) of the 2004 NHL Entry Draft.

Playing career
After playing four seasons in the Ontario Hockey League with the Ottawa 67's, Mancari made his professional debut with the Sabres' American Hockey League affiliate, the Rochester Americans, in the 2005–06 season. He played in 71 games and recorded 42 points. He made his National Hockey League debut with the Buffalo Sabres in the 2006–07 season, recording one assist in three games. He currently holds the AHL's hardest-shot record, with a speed of 102.8 mph in the 2008 AHL All-Star Classic Skills Competition.

Mancari was called up from Portland on November 21, 2008. The next day, he scored his first NHL goal against the New York Islanders. He was reassigned to the AHL on December 7, 2008 and named to the 2009 AHL Canadian All-Star team on January 6, 2009.

Mancari began the 2010–11 NHL season in Portland where he played 23 games for the Pirates before being recalled to the NHL to suit up for the Sabres on December 7, 2010. Mancari assisted on one goal in the away game against the Boston Bruins.

He signed a one-year contract worth $525,000 with the Vancouver Canucks on July 1, 2011. After one season in the Canucks' organization he returned to the Sabres, signing a one-year contract.

On July 5, 2013, Mancari again left the Sabres organization and signed a one-year, two-way deal with the St. Louis Blues.

On March 2, 2014, Mancari was traded to the Florida Panthers in return for Eric Selleck. He was assigned to AHL affiliate, the San Antonio Rampage where he would later secure an AHL contract for the following 2014–15 season.

On July 17, 2015, Mancari embarked on a European career, joining German club, Augsburger Panther of the Deutsche Eishockey Liga (DEL) on a one-year deal.

On March 9, 2016, Mancari left Augsburger as a free agent and inked a two-year deal with fellow DEL side Krefeld Pinguine. In leaving Krefeld after just one season, Mancari continued in Germany by appearing in the DEL2 with EHC Freiburg.

On May 9, 2018, Mancari left Germany to sign a one-year contract with the Graz 99ers in the neighbouring EBEL. Before joining the 99ers for pre-season, Mancari was unable to partake in a physical, cancelling his contract with the club. He later opted to return to EHC Freiburg on December 13, 2018. After playing in 10 games with Freiburg, Mancari retired from professional hockey on January 13, 2019.

Career statistics

Awards and honours

References

External links

1985 births
Living people
Canadian people of Italian descent
Augsburger Panther players
Buffalo Sabres draft picks
Buffalo Sabres players
Canadian ice hockey right wingers
Chicago Wolves players
EHC Freiburg players
Hillcrest High School (Ottawa) alumni
Krefeld Pinguine players
Sportspeople from London, Ontario
Ice hockey people from Ontario
Ottawa 67's players
Portland Pirates players
Rochester Americans players
San Antonio Rampage players
Vancouver Canucks players
Canadian expatriate ice hockey players in Germany